Ethington is an English surname. Notable people with the surname include:

 Raymond L. Ethington (born 1929), American paleontologist
 Tom Ethington (born 1980), American lacrosse player

See also
 Ettington

English-language surnames